Sarah Jean Colvin (born 13 July 1967) is a British scholar of German, literary theory, and gender studies. Since 2014, she has been Schröder Professor of German at the University of Cambridge. She previously held the Eudo C. Mason Chair of German at the University of Edinburgh (2004–2010), and was Professor in Study of Contemporary Germany at the University of Birmingham (2010–2012), then Professor of German at the University of Warwick (2013–2014).

Selected works

References

1967 births
Literary critics of German
British literary theorists
Gender studies academics
Academics of the University of Cambridge
Academics of the University of Birmingham
Academics of the University of Warwick
Living people